Confessions of a Pretty Lady is a book of poetry and prose by comedian, actress, singer, and writer Sandra Bernhard. It was published by Harper & Row in 1988 with a reprint in 1989. Both editions were in hardcover.

Contents 

The material is highly similar to that which Bernhard performed in her 1988 hit Broadway show Without You I'm Nothing, and the subsequent recording and film. It set the tone for the type of comedy she would be known for: biting satirical commentary on popular culture, celebrity, and politics.

1988 books
Harper & Row books